Brookline High School is a four-year public high school in the town of Brookline, Massachusetts. It is a part of Public Schools of Brookline. The Headmaster is Anthony Meyer who holds a Master of Education in Teaching and Curriculum from Harvard Graduate School of Education and a Bachelor of Arts in English from Boston College.

As of the 2021–22 school year, 2087 students were enrolled in the high school, served by 194.8 teachers (on an FTE basis), the student to teacher ratio was approximately 10.4 to 1. As of 2022, the enrolled student body race/ethnicity was self reported as 7.3% African American, 15.1% Asian, 12.7% Hispanic, 54.3% White, and 10.5% Multi-Race Non-Hispanic.

All students at Brookline High School must complete three credits' worth of electives, with the intent of fostering student creativity. A newly opened film program, facilitated through Brookline Access Television (BATV), enables students to produce their own films with state-of-the-art technology.

History
Brookline High School was founded in the Spring of 1843. Instruction began on August 17, 1843, on the lower floor of the Town Hall on Walnut Street described by a former student as a "dismal, damp and dark room...not unlike a tomb". Benjamin H. Rhodes a Brown University graduate was the founding Headmaster, serving until 1847. Mr. Rhodes was succeed as Headmaster by Hezekia Shailer who served until 1854. John Emory Horr a Harvard College graduate then served as Headmaster for 33 years until 1888. The second Brookline High School location was a newly constructed two-story building on School Street designed by architect Joseph L. Richard that opened on November 3, 1856. The third and present location of Brookline High School was Shailer Hall a new three and a half story brick structure with a pitched roof designed by architects Andrews, Jaques and Rantoul which opened in Fall, 1895. The Manual Arts building was built at a cost of $100,000 on Tappan Street, and opened in September, 1903. The ninth grade moved from the School of Practical Arts in the elementary schools to the high school in September 1921. An addition to the main building was finished at that time to increase the capacity to 1500 students. The main building was expanded and remodeled in 1965 with a budget of $1.5 million.

Architecture
The school has Symbolic Panels made by the sculptor John A. Wilson. In May 2018, Brookline voters supported a debt exclusion override to fund the expansion and renovation of Brookline High School. This building project included the construction of a new building at the 111 Cypress Street site, a new Science, Technology, Engineering, and Math (STEM) building to replace the building at the corner of Tappan and Greenough Streets, renovations to the 3rd floor of the main building and the Tappan gymnasium, as well as improvements to Cypress Field.

Academics

Brookline High School has received the gold medal for Best High Schools from U.S. News & World Report. In addition, Boston Magazine has frequently ranked Brookline High School as one of the best high schools in Massachusetts for academic performance; in 2008, it was ranked top in the state. In 2020, Boston Magazine ranked Brookline High School as the 20th best public school in Massachusetts. As of 2021, Brookline High School was ranked #64 nationally for STEM (Science, Technology, Engineering and Mathematics), according to U.S. News & World Report.

Although the Advanced Placement (AP) program at Brookline High School is smaller than at other high schools, it has grown dramatically over the past 10 years. In 2020–21, 435 students took 797 AP exams, and 91.9% of students scored “3” or above on these exams. In 2019, Brookline High School was ranked in the top 5% of the most challenging public high schools in America (952nd of 22,000). The rank was determined by the Challenge Index defined as the number of Advanced Placement, International Baccalaureate or Cambridge tests taken in a year relative to the number of seniors who graduate. In 2020, the 5-year graduation rate was 96.5% with 86% of students planning to attend a 4-Year private or public college.

Most Advanced Placement classes are only available to juniors and seniors. Honors level classes are considered rigorous, and students who excel in these classes often receive top scores on SAT Subject Tests.  Students who decide to take AP level classes are encouraged not to take more than 2 or 3 of them at one time, as these classes feature difficult research projects and labs in addition to standardized material.

Brookline High School does not calculate a weighted GPA for its students. Students receive only an unweighted GPA out of 4.0, so grades in Advanced Placement classes do not contribute any more to a student's GPA than grades in Honors and Standard level classes.

Athletics
Brookline High School features the largest interscholastic athletics program in New England, with 71 teams in 40 sports.  Some of the atypical sports include squash, curling, golf, ultimate disc, crew, sailing, water polo, and rugby.

The most popular athletics program at Brookline High School is ultimate disc with participation of over 110 students in 2017.

Since 1894, the Brookline High football team has played rival Newton North High School in the traditional Thanksgiving Day game. This is one of the oldest high school football rivalries in Massachusetts and on the list of high school football rivalries (100 years+).

In 2007, the Brookline High School boys cross country team made history by winning the first ever Nike Team Nationals northeast regional meet by just one point over Danbury High School at Bowdin Park, New York. They went on to place 7th at Nike Team Nationals in Portland, Oregon. In addition to the 2007 campaign, in the 2006 and 2009 seasons the team placed 3rd at the Massachusetts Division 1 State Meet, in 2005 they finished 2nd, and on November 20, 2010, won their second state championship, giving them their fifth top 3 finish in six years and second 1st-place finish in four. On November 19, 2011, they won their third state championship, for a run of three championships in five years.

In 2005, the Brookline High School rugby team captured the DI New England Championship, its first since 1987. In 2009, the team captured the DII title in the NERFU tournament in Pembroke, New Hampshire. The rugby players defeated Belmont 29–0 to win the New England title for the second time in five years (first in DII). In 2014, the rugby team again won the DII rugby state championship against Milton High School under head coach Craig Mackenzie.  The rugby team again had successful seasons in 2015 and 2016, making it to the finals and semi finals in both years.

In 2014, Brookline High School rebranded their athletics program's identity. The new logo featured a Spartan Warrior's helmet, successor to the arrowhead logo. A new color scheme was introduced as well, as navy blue replaced royal blue.

In 2013, the boys crew team took home their first national championship; the winning lightweight double featured athletes who would later go on to row on the Cornell and Princeton lightweight teams. In 2014, the boys took a bronze at nationals in the openweight double, only to win another national title in the double in 2015. In 2016, the boys lightweight four won their regional championship, but fell short of a third national title, placing 5th at nationals.

In 2021, the boys volleyball team had the 8th best record (15-5) of the 81 teams in Massachusetts.

School Within A School
School Within A School (SWS) is an alternative, democratic education program based in Brookline High School. It was created in the school year of 1969/70. Made up of about 120 students, SWS promotes democratic education in the form of a Town Meeting every Friday. All classes are for honors credit. English classes, chosen by students, are mixed grade level. They are usually discussion based and papers are the main form of assessment. Furthermore, students refer to all SWS staff on a first name basis.  A number of committees, created during Town Meeting or outside of class, convene during the student's free blocks. The program governs itself during Town Meeting, and teachers and students participate in a fair and equal democratic community. Admission to SWS is done via lottery with affirmative action during a student's freshman year. Students in SWS are responsible for their own attendance.

The Cypress

The Cypress (formerly The Sagamore)is a school-affiliated publication (newspaper) produced monthly by the students of Brookline High School. The first issue appeared in January, 1895. The newspaper is independent; the production is funded entirely through selling advertisements and subscriptions. It receives no funding from the high school.

Over the past few years, the paper has publicized and discussed issues in and around the school, including racism and teenage pregnancy. The school is noted for its tradition of high tolerance of sensitive topics discussed in the newspaper. In 2011, New England Scholastic Press Association awarded The Sagamore "Highest Achievement" in Newspaper Class I category.

Notable incidents
On September 25, 1936, Shailer Hall the original Brookline High School building constructed in 1895, was destroyed by fire. One hundred and sixty firemen fought the fire with at least fourteen treated for injuries. The cause and origin of the fire was a defective incinerator flue in a chimney. Financial losses amounted to $3 million in 2022 dollars.

Members of Fred Phelps' anti-gay Westboro Baptist Church protested at the 2005 graduation ceremony against Brookline High's strong acceptance of homosexuality. They were met by dozens of supporters and counter-protesters. Members from the Westboro Baptist Church protested again in 2009. They were met with about 2,000 counter-protesters, including students and members of Brookline High School's staff and PTO, and various other groups from surrounding areas. Surrounded and barricaded by police and deans of Brookline High School, the 'silent, not violent' counter-protest (organized by the school's GSA) took place with no altercations between the two groups.

In November 2017, Brookline High School students coordinated a walkout concerning the racial climate present through the high school. This event occurred after the spread of student produced videos containing racial slurs. The incident made local news and sparked discussion.

Amidst the COVID-19 pandemic in May 2020, hundreds of Brookline High School teachers were given pink slips due to lack of funding. This was met with criticism on a local level, causing protests and criticisms on the management of the school's administration.

Notable alumni

Jeff Adrien 2004, NBA player for Golden State Warriors, Houston Rockets, and Charlotte Bobcats, former University of Connecticut captain.
 Lenny Baker 1962, Tony Award-winning actor, I Love My Wife.
 Michael Bluestein 1987, musician, keyboardist for multi-platinum rock band Foreigner.
 Marita Bonner 1922, writer, essayist, and playwright of the Harlem Renaissance.
 Safra A. Catz 1979, CEO of Oracle Corporation.
 Hugh B. Cave 1927, short story writer.
 Jim Davis 1961, Chairman of New Balance
 James Driscoll 1996, professional golfer on the PGA Tour.
 Kitty Dukakis 1954, former First Lady of the state of Massachusetts
 Michael Dukakis 1951, 1988 Democratic presidential nominee and former Governor of Massachusetts.
 Theo Epstein 1991, former General Manager of the Boston Red Sox 
 James Gentle, 1922, professional soccer player
 Richard N. Goodwin 1949, author, columnist, speechwriter for presidents Kennedy and Johnson.
 David Hazony 1987, author, columnist, editor and translator, best known for his 2010 book The Ten Commandments (Scribner).
 John Hodgman 1989, humorist and author, best known for Apple's Get a Mac advertising campaign.
 Sam Kennedy 1991, President of the Boston Red Sox.
 George Kenney 1907, U.S. Air Force General during World War II.
 Robert C. Kingston 1947, U.S. Army General of the Korean and Vietnam wars.
 Robert Kraft 1959, owner of the New England Patriots.
 Albert Maysles 1944 & David Maysles 1949, documentary filmmakers of Salesman, Gimme Shelter, and Grey Gardens.
 Nicholas McCarthy 1988, film director.
 Vaughn Meader 1953, comedian, John F. Kennedy impersonator.
 Fred Newman 1960, professional baseball player for the Los Angeles Angels.
 Conan O'Brien 1981, comedian, writer, and TV host.
 Rebecca Onie 1994, population health advocate, intellectual, 2009 MacArthur Fellow.
 Thomas G. Osenton 1971, economist, author, for CEO The Sporting New Publishing Company.
 Francis Ouimet 1911, professional golfer and winner of the 1913 U.S. Open.
 Paul Pender 1949, world middleweight boxing champion.
 Thais M. Plaisted, 1916, educator, writer, parliamentarian
 Alan L. Rachins 1960, actor, Dharma and Greg, L.A. Law.
 Eli "Paperboy" Reed 2002, musician.
 Jonathon Riley 1997, 2004 Olympian in the 5000m run, 3-time U.S. champion, 2001 NCAA champion. 
 Dan Rosenthal 1984, member of the White House Senior Staff under Bill Clinton.
 Larry Ruttman 1948, attorney and author.
 Gabe Sapolsky 1990, pro wrestling promoter of ECW and Ring of Honor.
 Lew Schneider 1979, Hollywood producer of Everybody Loves Raymond and American Dad!.
 David Susskind 1938, TV producer and host of The David Susskind Show.
Ednah Shepard Thomas 1919, English professor at the University of Wisconsin.
 Alan Trefler 1973, founder and CEO of Pegasystems, chess master.
 Mike Wallace 1935, journalist, 60 Minutes.
 Joe "Tweet" Walsh 1934, former Major League Baseball player for the Boston Bees.
 Rick Weitzman 1963, professional basketball player for the Boston Celtics.
 John Yau 1968, Jackson Poetry Prize winning poet and critic.
 David Zuckerman 1989, 81st Lieutenant Governor of Vermont.

References

External links
 

Buildings and structures in Brookline, Massachusetts
Educational institutions established in 1843
Schools in Norfolk County, Massachusetts
Public high schools in Massachusetts
Bay State Conference
1843 establishments in Massachusetts